Qaleh-ye Komiz (also Romanized as Qal‘eh-ye Komīz) is a village in Abnama Rural District, in the Central District of Rudan County, Hormozgan Province, Iran. At the 2006 census, its population was 3,049, in 625 families.

References 

Populated places in Rudan County